UOH may refer to:

Universities

Africa
 University of Hargeisa, a Somaliland public university in Hargeisa

Americas
 Université d'État d'Haïti (University of Haiti), a Haitian university in Port-au-Prince
 University of Havana, a Cuban university in Havana
 University of Hawaii, a US public, co-educational college and university system in Hawaii
 University of Henrico, an aborted English university in Henricus, Virginia
 University of Holguín, a Cuban university in Holguín
 University of Houston, a US university in Houston, Texas

Asia
 University of Ha'li, a Saudi university in Ha'li
 University of Haifa, an Israeli university in Haifa
 University of Haripur, a Pakistani university in Haripur
 University of Hyderabad, an Indian university in Hyderabad
 University of Hyogo, a Japanese university in Kobe

Europe
 University of Harderwijk, a Dutch university in Harderwijk
 University of Helmstedt, a Brunswickan university in Helmstedt
 University of Helsinki, a Finnish university in Helsinki
 University of Huelva, a Spanish university in Huelva

England
 University of Hertfordshire, a university in Hatfield
 University of Huddersfield, a university in Huddersfield
 University of Hull, a university in Hull
 University of Lincoln (previously the University of Humberside), a university in Lincoln

Germany
 University of Hagen, a university in Hagen
 University of Halle, university merged in 1817 to become the Martin Luther University of Halle-Wittenberg
 University of Hamburg, a university in Hamburg
 University of Hannover, today known as the Leibniz University Hannover
 University of Hildesheim, a university in Hildesheim
 University of Hohenheim, a university in Stuttgart

Other
 Union of Horodło, a set of three acts signed in the town of Horodło on October 2, 1413
 Use of Hereford, a variant of the Roman Rite used in Herefordshire before the English Reformation